The Lincoln Monument of Wabash, Indiana or The Great Emancipator is a public sculpture by Charles Keck (September 9, 1875 – April 23, 1951), a sculptor who was born in New York City. The cast bronze sculpture was commissioned by Wabash-native Alexander New and donated to the city of Wabash, Indiana, in 1932. It has remained on view at the northeast corner of the Wabash County Courthouse lawn ever since.

Description

The sculpture depicts a larger-than-life Abraham Lincoln wearing a beard and sitting on a rock with his head slightly bowed forward and his arms resting on his knees. Both of his hands are closed except for his extended right index finger. Lincoln is wearing a bow tie, vest, long coat and boots—his right boot extends just beyond the edge of the base. His watch chain is visible on his vest.

Along the back proper left edge of the bronze base is a foundry mark that reads "Gorham Co. Founder". Just past this mark appears to be another kind of indecipherable foundry mark or signature written in black, raised letters.

The front of the granite base is inscribed:

LINCOLN

WITH MALICE TOWARD NONE

WITH CHARITY FOR ALL

The back of the granite base is inscribed:

ERECTED IN LOVING MEMORY

OF HIS PARENTS

ISAAC AND HENRIETTA NEW

BY

ALEXANDER NEW

1932

Other Versions
The Lincoln Monument of Hingham, Massachusetts
The town of Hingham, Massachusetts, owns what appears to be an identical version of this sculpture. It is displayed on a granite base and carries the same inscription on the front as the Wabash Lincoln. It was dedicated to the citizens of Hingham on September 23, 1939.

The Maquette of the Lincoln Monument
A maquette of the sculpture is owned by President Lincoln's Cottage at the Soldiers' Home, in Washington, D.C. The sculpture appears similar to the Wabash and Hingham versions, except that it is much smaller, Lincoln holds a book in his right hand, and his hat is visible near his right boot.

Materials
The sculpture was likely cast in multiple sections of bronze, a copper alloy. It rests on a granite-clad square base.

Dimensions
The bronze sculpture has an approximate height of 7 feet, depth of 6 feet, and width of 6 feet.

The base has an approximate height of 4 feet, depth of 7 feet, and width of 7 feet.

History and location
The sculpture was commissioned by Alexander New, who "grew up in Wabash, studied law, and ultimately built up a large chain of stores whose main offices were in New York."

The sculpture was unveiled and dedicated in Wabash on May 31, 1932 (Memorial Day), a year after Alexander New's death. A photograph  in the Indiana Historical Society collections from the day of the unveiling depicts the courthouse lawn with onlookers packed around the sculpture and even seated on one of the porch roofs of the Wabash County Courthouse. In this image the sculpture appears to have an even, dark patina.

Homer T. Showalter, the mayor of Wabash at the time of the sculpture's unveiling, provided this first-hand account of the sculptures installation:

The sculpture was inspected in 1992 as part of the Save Outdoor Sculpture! (SOS!) program and an on-line record  was created in the Smithsonian Institution Research Information System (SIRIS). The black-and-white image, taken around the time of that inspection, shows the sculpture no longer having the even, dark patina that the sculpture had when it was unveiled in 1932. Likewise, Greiff's 2005 publication shows the sculpture with a similar appearance.

As of June 2008, the sculpture appears to have a similar even, dark patina as it did in 1932, indicating that its appearance has recently been changed.

By comparison the version of this sculpture in Hingham, Massachusetts, appeared to have an even, dark patina when it was inventoried as part of the SOS! program in 1996. Likewise, the smaller version at President Lincoln's Cottage shows an even, dark patina.

Images

See also
 List of statues of Abraham Lincoln
 List of sculptures of presidents of the United States

References

External links
Information about the artwork
Lincoln Monument Wabash, Indiana, image of the unveiling on May 31, 1932, in the Indiana Historical Society's Digital Image Collections. 
President Lincoln's Cottage Blog post, "Keck's Lincoln Sculpture an Important Part of New Exhibit", July 21, 2008, shows an image of what was likely the model for the Wabash Lincoln.

Images or video of the artwork
 Flickr Group for Charles Keck
Photographs by Ann Horn on Shutterpoint 

Wabash, Indiana
Monuments and memorials in Indiana
Outdoor sculptures in Indiana
Buildings and structures in Wabash County, Indiana
1932 sculptures
Bronze sculptures in Indiana
Statues in Indiana
1932 establishments in Indiana
Sculptures of men in Indiana
Wabash, Indiana
Sculptures by Charles Keck